This is a list of major bridges in Perth, Western Australia. Most bridges cross either the Swan River or the Canning River, the two main rivers that traverse the Swan Coastal Plain. Others are overpasses for major roads.

Road bridges

Railway bridges

Pedestrian bridges

See also

References

General references

Bridges
Perth
Perth